Thomas Nørgaard (born 7 January 1987) is a retired Danish professional footballer. He is currently the goalkeeper coach of Silkeborg IF.

Coaching career
After retiring at the end of the 2018/19 season, Nørgaard became goalkeeper coach of Silkeborg IF.

References

Danish men's footballers
Danish Superliga players
1987 births
Living people
Skive IK players
Aarhus Fremad players
Silkeborg IF players
People from Silkeborg
Association football goalkeepers
Sportspeople from the Central Denmark Region